The Committee on Fisheries (PECH) is a committee of the European Parliament.

Chris Davies was the chairman (2019 – 2020) - until the United Kingdom left the European Union.

Committee mandate
PECH is the European Parliament committee responsible for:

1. the operation and development of the common fisheries policy and its management;

2. the conservation of fishery resources, the management of fisheries and fleets exploiting such resources and marine and applied fisheries research;

3. the common organisation of the market in fishery and aquaculture products and the processing and marketing thereof;

4. structural policy in the fisheries and aquaculture sectors, including the financial instruments and funds for fisheries guidance to support these sectors;

5. the integrated maritime policy as regards fishing activities;

6. sustainable fisheries partnership agreements, regional fisheries organisations and the implementation of international obligations in the field of fisheries.

Research service 
The Committee is directly supported by a research service, the Policy Department for Structural & Cohesion Policies. Most of its research studies and briefings are published online. The papers do not necessarily reflect the view of the Committee.

Recent publications (as of October 2018):

Fisheries in Ireland

Åland Islands

Training of Fishers

Fisheries in Andalusia – Atlantic region

Fisheries in Mauritania and the European Union

Landing Obligation and Choke Species in Multispecies and Mixed Fisheries – The North Western Waters

Landing Obligation and Choke Species in Multispecies and Mixed Fisheries – The South Western Waters

Landing Obligation and Choke Species in Multispecies and Mixed Fisheries –  The North Sea

Marine recreational and semi-subsistence fishing – its value and its impact on fish stock

Common Fisheries Policy and BREXIT

Regional ocean governance in Europe: the role of fisheries

Fisheries in Japan

Small-Scale Fisheries Markets: Value Chain, Promotion and Labelling

Small scale fisheries and “Blue Growth” in the EU

Impact of Fisheries Partnership Agreements on Employment in the EU and in Third Countries

Seafood Industry Integration in the EU

The Management of Fishing Fleets in Outermost Regions

See also 
 Agriculture and Fisheries Council (Council of the European Union)
 Directorate-General for Agriculture, Fisheries, Social Affairs and Health
 European Commissioner for Maritime Affairs and Fisheries
 Directorate-General for Maritime Affairs and Fisheries
 European Fisheries Control Agency

External links
 Official webpage
 Research for PECH Committee

Fisheries
European Union fishing regulations